Anybody's Woman is a 1930 American pre-Code drama film directed by Dorothy Arzner and written by Zoe Akins, Doris Anderson, and Gouverneur Morris. The film stars Ruth Chatterton, Clive Brook, Paul Lukas, Huntley Gordon, Virginia Hammond, Tom Patricola, and Juliette Compton. The film was released on August 15, 1930, by Paramount Pictures.

Plot
Neil Dunlap, an attorney whose wife has left him for a richer man, goes on a drinking binge and impulsively marries his neighbor Pansy Gray, a burlesque performer he once defended in court. After initially contemplating annulment, the unusual couple decide to try making the marriage work.

Cast
Ruth Chatterton as Pansy Gray
Clive Brook as Neil Dunlap
Paul Lukas as Gustave Saxon
Huntley Gordon as Grant Crosby
Virginia Hammond as Katherine Malcolm
Tom Patricola as Eddie Calcio
Juliette Compton as Ellen
Cecil Cunningham as Dot
Charles K. Gerrard	as Walter Harvey
Harvey Clark as Mr. Tanner
Sidney Bracey as Butler
Gertrude Sutton as Maid

References

External links 
 

1930 films
1930s English-language films
American drama films
1930 drama films
Paramount Pictures films
Films directed by Dorothy Arzner
American black-and-white films
Films scored by Karl Hajos
1930s American films